Jarošov nad Nežárkou is a municipality and village in Jindřichův Hradec District in the South Bohemian Region of the Czech Republic. It has about 1,100 inhabitants. It lies on the Nežárka river.

Administrative parts
Villages of Hostějeves, Kruplov, Lovětín, Matějovec, Nekrasín, Pejdlova Rosička and Zdešov are administrative parts of Jarošov nad Nežárkou.

References

Villages in Jindřichův Hradec District